Junior Citizen is the fourth album by the American alternative rock band Poster Children, released in 1995.

Production
The recording sessions took place at Smart Studios in Madison, Wisconsin. The album was produced by Brian Anderson and the band.

Critical reception
Trouser Press wrote that "[Rick] Valentin’s vocals have never been more pronounced, the rhythms never more insistent (or rigid), the tunes never punchier or more melodic." The Washington Post wrote that "the band's lack of a distinctive style does undermine the effectiveness of such catchy tracks as 'He's My Star' and 'New Boyfriend'." CMJ New Music Monthly thought that "the raw power of the band's early material has become superseded by technical noodling."

Track listing
 "Get a Life" – 5:04
 "Junior Citizen" – 5:15
 "He's My Star" – 4:22
 "Revolution Year Zero" – 3:06
 "Drug I Need" – 5:50
 "New Boyfriend" – 4:15
 "Wide Awake" – 4:09
 "King for a Day" – 2:02
 "Mustaine" – 2:57
 "Downwind" – 3:47
 "One of Us" – 4:21

Personnel
Brian Anderson – Producer, Engineer
Bryce Goggin – Mixing
Rick Valentin – Vocals, Guitar
Rose Marshack – Bass, vocals
Jim Valentin – Guitar
Howie Kantoff – Drums

References

1995 albums
Poster Children albums
Sire Records albums